Heli Maarit Kruger (née Koivula, formerly Koivula-Kruger; born 27 June 1975) is a Finnish former track and field athlete. She was born in Kauhajoki and represented Kauhajoen Karhu throughout her career. She lives in Vaasa. Her main athletic events were the triple jump and the long jump. She won the silver medal at the 2002 European Championships in Athletics in triple jump, with a wind assisted result of 14.83 metres. She held the Finnish record in triple jump, clearing 14.39 metres, from 2003 to 2021. She was married to discus thrower Frantz Kruger.

Achievements

References

External links
 
 
 

1975 births
Living people
People from Kauhajoki
Sportspeople from Vaasa
Finnish female long jumpers
Finnish female triple jumpers
Athletes (track and field) at the 1996 Summer Olympics
Athletes (track and field) at the 2004 Summer Olympics
Olympic athletes of Finland
European Athletics Championships medalists
20th-century Finnish women
21st-century Finnish women